Helme is a small borough in Tõrva Parish, Valga County, in southern Estonia. Prior to the 2017 reform of Estonian municipalities, it was located in Helme Parish. At the 2011 Census, the settlement's population was 167.

Helme castle
The settlement was first mentioned in the Livonian Chronicle of Henry in 1210. Helme church parish was first mentioned in 1329 during a Lithuanian raid. Most of the neighbouring land was fiefed in the 15th–16th centuries. Livonian Order castle in Helme (Ordensburg Helmet) was probably built in the first half of the 14th century. The site on a steep hill is believed to have been used as a stronghold earlier by Sackalians in the Ancient Estonia. By its ground plan the order castle was 120×60 m oval shaped structure, surrounded by two moats. There was a borough beside the castle in the Middle Ages, it was mentioned until the 17th century. The castle was destroyed by the Swedes during the Russo-Swedish War in 1658. Nowadays only parts of the walls with high window holes have survived.

Helme is the birthplace of poet and dramatist Henrik Visnapuu (1890-1951) and sculptress Erna Viitol (1920–2001).

Gallery

References

External links
Helme Parish 

Boroughs and small boroughs in Estonia
Castles of the Teutonic Knights
Kreis Fellin